Mavie Hörbiger (born 14 November 1979 in Munich) is a German-Austrian actress. Since 2009, she belongs to the ensemble of Vienna's Burgtheater.

Life and work 
Hörbiger descends from a famous Austrian family of actors and actresses, all at least for some times members of Austria's National Theatre, the Burgtheater. Her grandfather was Paul Hörbiger, his brother Attila Hörbiger was married to Paula Wessely. Actresses Elisabeth Orth, Christiane Hörbiger and Maresa Hörbiger are her aunts, comedians Cornelius Obonya and Christian Tramitz are  cousins. She holds both German and Austrian citizenship.

Hörbiger did not complete college but visited the acting school of Christa Willschrei in Munich. In 1996, she made her on-camera debut in Michael Gutmann's television feature "Nur für eine Nacht".

Mavie had theatre engagements in Hanover and Bochum (Rachel in Sanft und grausam, 2006; Jeannie in Fettes Schwein, 2005; title role in Lulu, 2004; Gilda in Komödie der Verführung, 2002; Santuzza in Freunde II, 2001). From 2006 to 2008 she performs at the Theater Basel, her first role there being "Roxane" in the play Cyrano de Bergerac, followed by "Stella" in A Streetcar Named Desire. Since 2009, she performs regularly at Vienna's Burgtheater. In 2007, she debuted at the prestigious Salzburg Festival, as Hermia in Shakespeare's A Midsummer Night's Dream. In 2013 she returned to Salzburg in a leading role in Nestroy's Lumpazivagabundus, directed by the director of the Burgtheater, Matthias Hartmann. In 2015, Hörbiger claimed two major successes at the Burgtheater, first in Tolstoj's The Power of Darkness, then as Ismene in Antigone by Sophocles.
 
She worked as an interviewer for VIVA and recorded several audiobooks.

In 2004, she ranked third in the voting for the 100 Sexiest Women In The World held by the German edition of FHM magazine, just behind Britney Spears and Heidi Klum. Mavie has ranked in the top 100 five times (in 2002, 2004, 2005. 2006 and 2008) and is widely considered to be one of the most attractive German women. She has turned down offers to pose nude for the German edition of Playboy magazine.

In December 2006 she married the German Burgtheater actor Michael Maertens. On 26 April 2009 the couple welcomed their first child, a daughter; a son was born in July 2012. The family lives in Switzerland and Austria.

Filmography

1996
Nur für eine Nacht (TV)
Director: Michael Gutmann

1998
Love Scenes from Planet Earth, as 'Nina'
Director: Marc Rothemund Cast: Cosma Shiva Hagen, Gudrun Landgrebe
, as 'Emmie Weller'
Cast: Götz George, Corinna Harfouch, Barbara Rudnik, Nikolaus Paryla, Katharina Thalbach

1999
Sinan Toprak ist der Unbestechliche (TV), as 'Liane Wagner'

2000
, as 'Ina'
Cast: , Anke Engelke
Fandango, as 'Tina'
Cast: Moritz Bleibtreu, Corinna Harfouch
Inspector Rex, episode Full power (S6E1), as 'Claudia'

2001
Jeans, as herself
Cast: Jasmin Tabatabai, Benno Fürmann
Vera Brühne (TV), as 'Stephanie Virno'
Cast: Corinna Harfouch, Uwe Ochsenknecht, Michael Degen, Ulrich Noethen, Hans Werner Meyer, Hans-Peter Korff, Fritz Wepper
Vier Meerjungfrauen (TV), as 'Merle'
Cast: Hannelore Hoger, Jürgen Schornagel, August Zirner
100 Pro, as 'Vicky'
Director: Simon Verhoeven Cast: Ken Duken, Max von Thun, Luca Verhoeven
Zsa Zsa
Cast: Max Tidof

2002
Nogo, as 'Rosa'
Cast: Meret Becker, Giora Seeliger, Jasmin Tabatabai
Schweigen ist Gold (TV), as 'Jenny'
Cast: , Horst Krause, Peter Sattmann, Julia Richter, Leslie Malton
Auf Herz und Nieren, as 'Nicole'
Cast: Steffen Wink, Udo Kier, Burt Reynolds, Xavier Naidoo, Axel Schulz
Tatort - Zartbitterschokolade (TV)
Director: Erhard Riedlsperger Cast: August Schmölzer, Dominic Raacke

2003
Napoléon (TV), as 'Marie Louise of Austria'
Cast: Christian Clavier, John Malkovich, Isabella Rossellini, Gérard Depardieu, Heino Ferch, Alexandra Maria Lara, Sebastian Koch, Marie Bäumer
Feiertag
Cast: Dietmar Mössmer
The Poet, as 'Rita'
Cast: Dougray Scott, Jürgen Prochnow, Miguel Herz-Kestranek
Fremder Freund, as 'Nora'
Cast: Mina Tander, Antonio Wannek, Navíd Akhavan
Shit Happens, as 'Silea'

2004
7 Dwarves – Men Alone in the Wood, as 'Little Red Riding Hood'
Cast: Cosma Shiva Hagen, Nina Hagen, Helge Schneider, Christian Tramitz, Otto Waalkes
So fühlt sich Liebe an (TV), as 'Alexandra'
Cast: Maria Furtwängler, Hannes Jaenicke, Jan Gregor Kremp, Ute Willing
Ring of the Nibelungs (TV), as 'Lena'
Cast: Benno Fürmann, Kristanna Loken, Alicia Witt
Giacomo Casanova (TV), as 'Bellino (Teresa)'
Cast: Robert Hunger-Bühler, Michael Brandner, Martina Gedeck

2005
Blackout Journey, as 'Stella'
Cast: Marek Harloff, Arno Frisch
Arme Millionäre (TV), episodes 1 to 4, as 'Lilo Rafael'
Cast: Sky du Mont, Andrea Sawatzki

2006
Three Sisters Made in Germany (TV), as 'Guddi'
Cast: Barbara Rudnik, Karoline Eichhorn, Stefan Kurt
Esperanza, as 'Natascha'
Cast: Anna Thalbach, Boris Aljinovic
Die Ohrfeige (TV), as 'Elisabeth'
Cast: Herbert Knaup, Julia Stemberger
Arme Millionäre (TV), episodes 5 to 12, as 'Lilo Rafael'
Marmorera, as 'Paula Cavegn'
Cast: Anatole Taubmann, Eva Dewaele

2007
Marmorera

2011
What a Man

2014
Coming In

2017
Axolotl Overkill
Cast: Jasna Fritzi Bauer, Arly Jover, Laura Tonke
The Garden
Lommbock

Theatre performances

2001
Freunde II as 'Santuzza' in Hanover

2002
Komödie der Verführung as 'Gilda' in Hanover and Bochum

2004
Lulu as 'Lulu' in Bochum

2005
Fettes Schwein as 'Jeannie' in Hanover

2006
Sanft und grausam as 'Rachel' in Hanover
Cyrano de Bergerac as 'Roxane' in Basel

2007
A Streetcar Named Desire as 'Stella' in Basel
Vor Sonnenuntergang as 'Ottilie Klamroth' in Basel
A Midsummer Night's Dream as 'Hermia' in Salzburg and Zürich
The Brothers Lionheart as 'Karl Lionheart' in Basel

2008
Doubleface oder die Innenseite des Mantels as 'Sylvie' in Basel
Liebe und Geld as 'Jess' in Basel
Die Judith von Shimoda as 'Judith' in Vienna

2009
Lorenzaccio as 'Catarina' in Vienna

2011
Peter Pan in Vienna
Wir sind noch einmal davongekommen in Basel

2012
''Wastwater in Vienna

Awards
Golden Romy in the category "Most favoured female newcomer 2001"

References

External links
 www.mavie-hoerbiger.com
 Mavie Hörbiger fanpage

1979 births
Living people
Austrian stage actresses
German stage actresses